Pavel Aleksandrovich Rostovtsev (Russian: Павел Александрович Ростовцев; born 21 September 1971) is a Russian former biathlete.

Life and career
Rostovtsev lives in Krasnoyarsk. He is a three times world champion in biathlon. He has competed in the World Cup since the 1995–96 season. In 2000 he became World Champion with the Russian relay team in the World Championships in Lahti. The following year he won both the sprint and the pursuit in the World Championships in Pokljuka. In the 2001–02 season he came second in the overall World Cup standings. He hasn't won a single World Cup competition since the 2001–02 season.
In the 2006 Olympics in Turin he was a part of the silver medal winning Russian relay team.

In November 2006, Rostovtsev announced his retirement due to disagreements with the Russian Biathon Union.

Biathlon results
All results are sourced from the International Biathlon Union.

Olympic Games
1 medal (1 silver)

*Mass start was added as an event in 2006.

World Championships
9 medals (3 gold, 6 silver)

*During Olympic seasons competitions are only held for those events not included in the Olympic program.
**Team was removed as an event in 1998, and mass start was added in 1999 with the mixed relay being added in 2005.

Individual victories
7 victories (2 In, 2 Sp, 3 Pu)

*Results are from UIPMB and IBU races which include the Biathlon World Cup, Biathlon World Championships and the Winter Olympic Games.

References

External links
 

1971 births
Living people
People from Gus-Khrustalny
Russian male biathletes
Biathletes at the 2006 Winter Olympics
Biathletes at the 2002 Winter Olympics
Olympic biathletes of Russia
Medalists at the 2006 Winter Olympics
Olympic medalists in biathlon
Olympic silver medalists for Russia
Biathlon World Championships medalists
Sportspeople from Vladimir Oblast
20th-century Russian people
21st-century Russian people